The Blue Bird TC/2000 is a product line of buses that was produced by the American manufacturer Blue Bird Corporation (then Blue Bird Body Company) from 1987 to 2003.  Introduced as a second transit-style product range alongside the Blue Bird All American, the TC/2000 was produced in front-engine and rear-engine layouts. While produced primarily as a yellow school bus, Blue Bird offered the TC/2000 in commercial configurations and numerous custom-built variants. For commercial use, Blue Bird badged the model line as the TC/2000 or the APC 2000 (All Purpose Coach).

In 2003, Blue Bird ended production of the TC/2000 (after a short run of 2004 models), consolidating its transit-style product range with the All American. During its production, Blue Bird assembled the TC/2000 at five assembly facilities, including: Blue Bird Body Company (Fort Valley, Georgia), Blue Bird North Georgia (LaFayette, Georgia; closed 2010), Blue Bird Midwest (Mount Pleasant, Iowa; closed 2002), Blue Bird East (Buena Vista, Virginia; closed 1992), and Blue Bird Canada (Brantford, Ontario; closed 2007).

Background
In the 1930s, transit-style (flat-front) school buses made their first appearance as manufacturers sought to develop school buses with higher capacity and greater maneuverability.  Before World War II, California-based manufacturers Crown Coach, Gillig and Seattle-based Kenworth-Pacific had put various versions of the type into production; the most common was the forward-control bus, with the engine positioned next to the driver.

After World War II, Blue Bird company founder Albert Luce developed the first Blue Bird All American; similar to a bus he viewed at the 1948 Paris Auto Show, it was also of a forward-control design. Unable to secure a supply of GMC chassis, Luce produced the initial All Americans on conversions of conventional truck chassis, as was the practice of the time. In 1952, the company would make a decision that would forever affect the production of the All American, and potentially all school buses in the United States. Starting that year, Blue Bird started chassis production for the All American; aside from the powertrain, the company now was able to control nearly the entire design of the vehicle. Following a major redesign for 1957, Blue Bird would only make gradual detail changes to the All American for the following 32 years.

As the highest-capacity vehicles (84 to 90 passengers vs. 60 to 72 passengers) produced in the United States, transit-style school buses had become marketed as the flagship vehicles of their respective manufacturers (the All American also had the distinction of being the donor vehicle of the costly Blue Bird Wanderlodge motorhome). However, as the 1970s became the 1980s, school bus demand declined sharply. Declining student populations coupled with the overall recession magnified the overall importance of securing orders by contractors and large school districts. While higher-capacity buses could potentially lower operating costs across a large fleet, higher purchase prices were an increasingly hard sell to customers.

In 1986, the first low-price transit school bus was introduced. Wayne Corporation debuted the Lifestar; its high degree of parts commonality allowed it to be priced nearly the same as the Wayne Lifeguard conventional. However, chassis supply for the Lifestar would be plagued for much of its production run, which would render it non-competitive.

During the late 1980s, along with a low-priced bus such as the Lifestar, Blue Bird was faced with having to compete with the All American; aside from powertrain updates, it had gone nearly unchanged since the early 1960s. To solve both problems, the TC/2000 was introduced in 1988. While much of the same body (the passenger compartment, also shared with the Conventional and Mini Bird) was shared along with the chassis, major changes were done to the forward body in the interest of lowering production costs. Chrome trim was virtually eliminated and the grille was changed from 14 slots to 4. The quad headlights of the All American were replaced with dual rectangular units on the TC/2000; when the All American was redesigned in 1989, the headlight count became the easiest way to tell the two buses apart. 
     
Inside, in the interest of lowering production costs and introducing an updated design, the TC/2000 was given its own drivers' compartment. The All American's wood-panel dashboard was replaced with a black fiberboard design with the instruments positioned closer to the driver (who was greeted with a smaller steering wheel). An all-new side control console made its way into the All American in its 1989 redesign. As in the All American Forward Engine, student seating capacity ranged from 54 to 90.

Mechanically, the TC/2000 continued the same theme of lowering production costs; Blue Bird developed relatively few combinations that could be built. At its 1987 launch, only a front-engine version was produced. Although the All American was produced with several available transmissions, a gasoline engine, and at least 3 diesel engines options, the TC/2000 was produced only with the Chevrolet 7.0L gasoline V8 as standard with the Cummins 5.9L diesel inline-6 as an option; nearly all were produced with the Cummins. A 5-speed manual was standard, with the Allison AT545 as an option, but nearly all customers specified the automatic.

Design timeline

1988: Late 1987 entry into production; only front-engine configuration offered.  Gasoline (Chevrolet 7.0L) and diesel (Cummins 5.9L) engine offerings
1989: Minor update to front lights: rectangular reflectors from All American replaced by square units in between headlights.   
1990: Largely unchanged from 1988 to 1989
1991: TC/2000 Rear Engine introduced to attract West Coast customers. As a running change, front bodywork TC/2000 Front Engine is redesigned with a flip-up access panel. This allows for better access and serviceability for drivers and mechanics; it requires the headlight bar and front bumper to be moved forward several inches. On front-engine models, the grille is redesigned for better cooling; 4 chrome bars replace the 4 slots (rear-engine versions use a blank version of the 1988-1990 bodywork).  Inside, a redesigned engine cover takes up less space in the driver compartment.        
1992: TC/2000 front bodywork redesigned on both versions. Similar to the All American, three hinged access panels allow access to service points and the engine radiator (on front-engine models). To distinguish itself from its All American counterpart, the TC/2000 Rear Engine has a false version of the front-engine grille (rather than none at all on the All American); in the rear, the TC/2000 is distinguished by the lack of engine intake vents above the rear side windows. 
1993: As a result of changes to the Cummins diesel engine, the engine cover is redesigned further to give a much lower profile. Additionally, the gear shifter for the automatic transmission moves from the left side of the instrument panel to the right side.  
1994: To lower costs, the TC/2000 now shares its pedals and instrument panel with the General Motors medium-duty truck line (the chassis used by the Blue Bird CV200) 
1995: As diesel engines have largely replaced gasoline-fueled engines in transit-style school buses (as well as all full-size school buses), the Chevrolet 7.0L V8 is discontinued.     
1996: Carryover from 1995
1997: TC/1000 introduced (see notes); flat-floor transit-style school bus based upon TC/2000.
1998: Carryover from 1997, last year for TC/2000 Rear Engine
1999: TC/2000 Rear Engine discontinued, replaced by All American A3RE. Front-engine models receive a new electronically controlled instrument cluster with digital odometer and supplementary gauges. Outside, the headlight bar becomes all-yellow.
2000: Carryover from 1999. 
2001: Electronic instrument panel replaced by larger analog instrument panel shared with All American. Last year for TC/1000.
2002: Side control panel (in use since 1988) replaced by newer version from All American. Last known year for the 5-speed manual transmission in the TC/2000.  
2003: Final year of production; carryover from 2002.  Production ends in 2003, with a few built as 2004 models.

Discontinuation

With the 1997 introduction of the TC/1000, Blue Bird produced a total of five distinct transit-style school buses. Consequently, the variety would lead to some model overlap. In 1998, Blue Bird discontinued the rear-engine version of the TC/2000; it was indirectly replaced by the new-for-1999 All American RE. Blue Bird's financial problems of the early 2000s (decade) led to the discontinuation of the TC/2000 FE at the end of 2003 in an effort to consolidate its Type D school bus lineup.

Powertrain
To keep the price down, Blue Bird simplified the powertrain lineup with a single gasoline engine (a Chevrolet 427 cubic-inch V8) and a single diesel engine (a Cummins 6BTA5.9/ISB inline-6). Theoretically, a manual transmission was available, but almost all TC/2000s were supplied with an Allison AT-545 automatic transmission. When the TC/2000 RE was added in 1991, the Cummins C 8.3/ISC 8.3 and Allison MT-643 were added to the lineup; however, these were exclusive to the RE. After 1995, the gasoline engine choice was dropped due to the popularity of diesel engines in Type D school buses.

Manufacturing

Over its lifetime, the TC/2000 was assembled in five of Blue Bird's manufacturing facilities.
Blue Bird Body Company (Fort Valley, Georgia)
Blue Bird North Georgia (LaFayette, Georgia); closed 2010
Blue Bird Midwest (Mount Pleasant, Iowa); closed in 2002.
Blue Bird Canada (Brantford, Ontario); closed in 2007
Blue Bird East (Buena Vista, Virginia); closed in 1993

Variants

Blue Bird TC/1000 
The TC/1000 was a variant of the TC/2000 FE intended primarily for buyers who transported special-needs students.  The vehicle was designed with a completely flat interior floor (to match the wheelchair capacity of a much larger bus).  Shortened to a 132-inch wheelbase, the front-engine TC/1000 shares a nearly identical chassis configuration as the larger TC/2000.  To eliminate wheel intrusion into the interior, the bus chassis used lower-profile 19.5-inch wheels.  After 1998, Blue Bird revised the body of the TC/1000, squaring off the corners of the roofline.

The TC/1000 was not a large success, competing against less-expensive school buses derived from van chassis; the model line was phased out after 1999 production.  While Blue Bird has not produced a successor model line, the squared-off roofline returned in the design of the 2010-2013 All American.

Commercial derivatives 
Alongside the All American, the TC/2000 (and TC/1000) served as the donor platform for several Blue Bird commercial buses during the 1990s. Using the same body as the school bus, the APC 2000 was designed with a variety of different seating types as well as interior luggage storage. Geared more towards transit and shuttle use (in line with the Q-Bus), the CS featured a number of exterior modifications to the body; a TransShuttle version based on the TC/1000 was designed with an optional central-mounted door. In addition to fully built buses, Blue Bird produced the CS as a "shell vehicle"; it was a bare body without windows or an interior intended for purchase to be converted into various types of specialty vehicles.

In addition to transit-oriented buses, Blue Bird also produced the CS/APC and TC/2000 for use in law enforcement. While typically utilized as prisoner transports, some variants were also outfitted as mobile command centers.

See also

 Blue Bird All American 
 AmTran RE
 Thomas Saf-T-Liner MVP
 Wayne Lifestar
 Ward Senator (AmTran Genesis)

References 

School buses
TC 2000
Vehicles introduced in 1987
School bus chassis